August Topman (10 July 1882 Kabala Parish, Harju County – 8 September 1968 Tallinn) was an Estonian composer, organist, conductor.

1904–1919, he was organist in St. John's Church.

He was one of the founders of Tallinn Higher Music School (established in 1919). 1923–1950, he was teacher of music theory and organ at  Tallinn Higher Music School.

1944–1949, he was a member of Estonian Composers' Union.

In 1957, he was given the honorary title: Estonian SSR Honoured Worker in Arts.

Works

 "In the Evening" (variations for piano, 1911)
 "Requiem" (1932)

References

1882 births
1968 deaths
Estonian composers
Estonian conductors (music)
Estonian organists